An , or , is a Japanese term for a three-month period of intense training for students of Zen Buddhism, lasting anywhere from 90 to 100 days. The practice during ango consists of meditation (zazen), study, and work (samu (作務)).

Ango is typically held twice a year, the first period from spring to summer and the second period from fall to winter. The word ango literally translates as "dwelling in peace"; the summer ango is referred to as ge-ango and the winter period is u-ango. Additionally, some monasteries and Zen centers hold just one ango per year.

 Concerning Zen practice in the United States, author Ellen Birx writes,

See also
Kyol Che
Sesshin
Zazen
Vassa

Notes

References

Zen